Rumisberg is a municipality in the Oberaargau administrative district in the canton of Bern in Switzerland.

History
Rumisberg is first mentioned in 1364 as Rumolsberg.

Geography
Of this area, 49.8% is used for agricultural purposes, while 42.1% is forested. Of the rest of the land, 7.4% is settled (buildings or roads) and the remainder (0.8%) is non-productive (rivers, glaciers or mountains).

The municipality includes the village of Rumisberg, the hamlets of Schoren and Weissacker-Falken and scattered individual houses.

Demographics
, 3.4% of the population was made up of foreign nationals. Over the last 10 years the population has grown at a rate of 11.3%. Most of the population speaks German  (98.5%), with Italian being second most common ( 0.4%) and Serbo-Croatian being third ( 0.4%).

In the 2007 election the most popular party was the SVP which received 52.8% of the vote.  The next three most popular parties were the SPS (14.8%), the FDP (14.5%) and the Green Party (10.1%).

The age distribution of the population is children and teenagers (0–19 years old) make up 24% of the population, while adults (20–64 years old) make up 61.1% and seniors (over 64 years old) make up 14.9%.  In Rumisberg about 78.5% of the population (between age 25-64) have completed either non-mandatory upper secondary education or additional higher education (either university or a Fachhochschule).

Rumisberg has an unemployment rate of 1.19%.  , there were 23 people employed in the primary economic sector and about 11 businesses involved in this sector.  8 people are employed in the secondary sector and there are 4 businesses in this sector.  24 people are employed in the tertiary sector, with 8 businesses in this sector.
The historical population is given in the following table:

References

External links

 

Municipalities of the canton of Bern